Sorry Vampire is the second studio album recorded by John Ralston. The album was released on October 2, 2007 on Vagrant Records.

Track listing
 Fragile (2:41)
 The Only Evidence (3:10)
 When I Was a Bandage (1:56)
 I Guess I Wasted My Summer Now (3:49)
 Lessons I & II (3:20)
 A Small Clearing (3:44)
 Ghetto Tested (3:07)
 Beautiful Disarmed (2:44)
 No One Loves You Like I Do (4:19)
 Second Hand Lovers (4:16)
 Haven't Missed You All My Life (3:19)
 Where You Used to Sleep (6:00)

John Ralston (musician) albums
2007 albums